Pseudobixadus marshalli is a species of beetle in the family Cerambycidae, and the only species in the genus Pseudobixadus. It was described by Stephan von Breuning in 1936.

References

Lamiini
Beetles described in 1936